Match of the Century has referred to many events in various sports:

Contract bridge
 Bridge Battle of the Century, Lenz vs Culbertson, 1931–1932

Chess
 The World Chess Championship 1972, between Bobby Fischer and defending champion Boris Spassky
 Several of the USSR and Russia versus the Rest of the World chess team matches, held in 1970, 1984, and 2002

Golf
 The 1926 exhibition 72-hole match between Walter Hagen and Bobby Jones

Horse racing
 The defeat of War Admiral by Seabiscuit on November 1, 1938

Rugby
 The Match of the Century (rugby union), played between Wales and New Zealand in 1905

Football
 The Match of the Century (1953 England v Hungary football match) 
 Italy v West Germany (1970 FIFA World Cup), also called The Game of the Century
 South Melbourne vs Geelong (1886 VFA season), also called the Game of the Century

Tennis
 The Match of the Century (tennis), between Suzanne Lenglen and Helen Wills in 1926
 The Battle of the Sexes (tennis), exhibition match between Billie Jean King and Bobby Riggs

See also 
 Fight of the Century (disambiguation)
 The Game of the Century (disambiguation)